Jorge Antonio Giordani Cordero (born in San Francisco de Macorís, Dominican Republic, June 30, 1940)  is a Venezuelan politician and Marxian economist.

Early life
Jorge Giordani was born on June 30, 1940, in the city of San Francisco de Macorís in the Dominican Republic. His parents were both immigrants; his father from Italy and his mother from Spain. Both had left Europe in the wake of the Spanish Civil War, in which Jorge's father had fought on the Republican side as part of the Garibaldi Battalion. In 1942, Jorge and his family moved to Caracas, Venezuela. Jorge and his mother became naturalised citizens of the country, while his father retained his Italian citizenship. Jorge's primary-level education took place at the Escuela Experimental Venezuela, his secondary education at the Lyceum Andrés Bello. After graduating high school, he pursued a Bachelors in Electrical Engineering at the Central University of Venezuela, where he joined the Communist Party of Venezuela in protest of Rafael Trujillo's dictatorship in the Dominican Republic. He completed a Masters at the University of Bologna in Italy, and went on to receive a Ph. D. in Planning and Development from the University of Sussex in the United Kingdom.

He returned to the Central University of Venezuela to teach classes in Engineering. He was still a professor at the time of Hugo Chávez's attempted coup d'état in 1992. In interviews, Giordani describes himself as entirely supportive of the attempt, and was introduced to Chávez in the aftermath by Adina Bastidas. In 1999, he was approached to take the position of Minister of Planning under the Chávez presidency.

In government
Giordani served several separate terms in the Ministry: from February 1999 to May 2002; from April 2003 to January 2008; and from February 2009 until June 2014, with a week-long replacement from November 25 to December 5, 2012, by Ramón Antonio Yánez Marro. He also took up the role of Minister of Finance from 2010 to 2013.

He was nicknamed "the Monk" in reference to his austere lifestyle, and was one of Chávez's closest advisers and the chief architect of the country's state-led economic system. While in office, he published a book, The Venezuelan Transition to Socialism, in 2001. The work is a retrospective on the 20th century history of Venezuela.

Political opponents accused Giordani of being a "Soviet-era dinosaur" and placed upon him a large amount of the blame for the country's financial crisis, which began in 2013. Criticism of his policies mounted, and Giordani was removed from his position on the board of the Central Bank of Venezuela in June 2014. A week later, on June 17, 2014, he was dismissed from his position as Minister of Planning by Chávez's successor, Nicolás Maduro. He was replaced as Minister of Planning by the former Minister of Education, Ricardo José Menéndez Prieto. Maduro had already replaced Giordani in his role as Minister of Finance with Nelson Merentes the previous year. 

The day after his dismissal from government, Giordani published a letter in which he outlined his achievements in office, which he saw as "Dramatic cuts in poverty; the dismantling of power relations that allowed foreign and domestic capital to control the state, in particular the state oil company PDVSA; and the creation of a public sector that now dominates key economic sectors." He went on to criticise Maduro and his government, accusing him of demonstrating a lack of leadership and of squandering Chávez's legacy through corruption, government bureaucracy and "fiscal nymphomania". A speech given by Maduro on June 19 made heavy reference to "betrayals" by former members of the government, which many took to refer to Giordani and his published letter.

Giordani has continued to speak out against the Maduro presidency in the years since, including a denouncement of the loss of $300bn to corruption in 2016.

References

External links
  The letter published by Jorge Giordani in response to his dismissal from government, retrieved from the Aporrea website.

1940 births
Living people
People from San Francisco de Macorís
Venezuelan politicians
Marxian economists
Venezuelan economists
Central University of Venezuela alumni
Academic staff of the Central University of Venezuela
University of Bologna alumni
Alumni of the University of Sussex
Planning ministers of Venezuela

es:Jorge Giordani
fr:Jorge Giordani